The 1991 World Wushu Championships was the 1st edition of the World Wushu Championships. It was held in Beijing, China from October 12 to October 16, 1991. This was the first international competition held and organized by the International Wushu Federation.

Medal summary

Medal table

Men's taolu

Men's sanda

Women's taolu

References



World Wushu Championships
Wushu Championships
World Wushu Championships, 1991
World Wushu Championships
Wushu competitions in China
1991 in wushu (sport)